Chaohu Stadium is a multi-purpose stadium in Chaohu, China that is currently under construction.  It will be used mostly for football matches.  The stadium will hold 30,000 spectators.  It is due to open in 2012 and broke ground in 2010.

References

Football venues in China
Multi-purpose stadiums in China
Stadiums under construction
Buildings and structures under construction in China
Sports venues in Anhui
Buildings and structures in Hefei